Julia Dorny (born 20 February 1990), is a German athlete, media scientist, journalist and television presenter who has won various World and European Championships in three martial arts disciplines. She is the only female athlete in the world who has won championships in judo, mixed martial arts and sumo wrestling. She was the first German woman to become MMA European Champion and MMA World Champion in featherweight within the IMMAF amateurs.

Sports career (beginnings, judo and sumo career) 

At the age of 7 Dorny began to be enthusiastic about judo. Since the age of 14 she has been fighting in the German Judo League. At the age of 17 she fought for the first time in the inaugural Judo Bundesliga (PSV Rostock). At 18, she was awarded her black belt in judo. Dorny is a multiple-time Berlin judo champion. She was German vice-champion in the individual classification, several times winner of the national ranking tournament and has countless international successes to her credit. In 2005 she qualified for the European Judo Championship, but was unable to compete due to injury. Dorny was a cadre athlete at the Olympic Training Center Berlin as well as in the German Judo Federation (DJB). Dorny was a student at the Werner-Seelenbinder-Sportschule, today's Schul- und Leistungssportzentrum Berlin (SLZB). With her former first division club JC Wiesbaden, she won bronze at the team championships. She is currently under contract for first division club JC 71 Düsseldorf.

Sumo career 
In 2016 Dorny began sumo training and later that year she became German champion, won bronze at the European Championships, and took 5th place at the World Championships. In 2017 she received a shodan (1st dan) ranking in sumo wrestling. In her sumo career, Dorny became a multiple-time German champion (individual and open weight), secured 5th place at the 2017 World Games, and won silver at the 2019 US Open in Los Angeles.

MMA career 
Dorny won her MMA debut as an amateur at the German Championships (GEMMAF) 2015. In the same year she was nominated for the IMMAF World Championship in Las Vegas – winning bronze at her international debut. She then proved to be a consistent performer by winning another bronze medal at the IMMAF European Championship in Birmingham. In the following years, she participated in the IMMAF European (2016 runner-up European Champion) and IMMAF World Championships (2016 runner-up World Champion, 2017 bronze). In 2018 she took her performance to the next level and managed to become European and World Champion on her first attempt. This rare feat made her the first German European champion and the first German World Champion in the featherweight division.

German Mixed Martial Arts Championship (GMC) 
After winning the European and World Championships, Dorny made her professional debut in front of her home crowd on 29 June 2019 at GMC20 in Berlin against Miriam Santana Ramos. She defeated Ramos in the first round by TKO (ground and pound). This fight was also the first GMC women's fight broadcast on FreeTV. She had her second fight at GMC22 on 12 October 2019 against Mariam Tatunashvili, which she also won through TKO (ground and pound) in the second round.

Scientific and journalistic achievements 
In addition to her sports career, Dorny works as presenter, and on-air reporter, media scientist, and speaker for Deutsche Welle TV (DW) and N-tv. Dorny completed her journalistic training at DW, German public, state-owned international broadcaster.

She graduated with a bachelor's degree in journalism and corporate communications in 2013. In 2017 she completed her master's degree in media studies at the Humboldt University of Berlin, majoring in the topic of "Framing in Journalism". 

Since January 2020 Dorny has been running her own podcast, "WOMEN HIT HARDER – The Female Power Podcast by MMA World Champion Julia Dorny" and regularly releases new episodes. Among her previous guests are actor Jürgen Vogel, boxer Axel Schulz, boxing world champion Regina Halmich and chief editor of ICON Inga Griese such as actor Ken Duken, marathon twins Anna und Lisa Hahner and Olympic champions like Kevin Kuske, Matthias Steiner and Eric Franke.

In April 2020 she was appointed to the "Athletes' Commission" of the IMMAF.

Mixed martial arts achievements 

IMMAF World Champion
 IMMAF European Champion

Mixed martial arts record

|-
|Loss
|align=center|2–1
|Jeslen Mishelle
|TKO (punches)
|PFL Challenger Series 3
|
|align=center|1
|align=center|3:51
|Orlando, Florida, United States
|
|-
|Win
|align=center|2–0
|Mariam Tatunashvili
|TKO (punches)
|GMC 22
|
|align=center|2
|align=center|2:21
|Hamburg, Germany
|
|-
|Win
|align=center|1–0
|Miriam Santana
|TKO (punches)
|GMC 20
|
|align=center|1
|align=center|3:04
|Berlin, Germany
|
|-

Amateur mixed martial arts record

|-
|Win
|align=center|10–5
|Paulina Kosakowska
|TKO (punches)
|Cage FS 9
|
|align=center|1
|align=center|1:56
|Graz, Austria
|
|-
|Win
|align=center|9–5
|Jenni Kivioja
|Submission (armbar)
|rowspan=2|2018 IMMAF-WMMAA Unified World Championships
|
|align=center|2
|align=center|2:09
|rowspan=2|Manama, Bahrain
|
|-
|Win
|align=center|8–5
|Meng Chen
|Submission (rear-naked choke)
|
|align=center|2
|align=center|2:01
|
|-
|Win
|align=center|7–5
|Jenni Kivioja
|Decision (unanimous)
|rowspan=2|2018 IMMAF European Championships
|
|align=center|3
|align=center|3:00
|rowspan=2|Bucharest, Romania
|
|-
|Win
|align=center|6–5
|Anniina Ervasti
|Decision (unanimous)
|
|align=center|3
|align=center|3:00
|
|-
|Loss
|align=center|5–5
|Gase Sanita
|Decision (split)
|rowspan=2|2017 IMMAF World Championships
|
|align=center|3
|align=center|3:00
|rowspan=2|Manama, Bahrain
|
|-
|Win
|align=center|5–4
|Izabel Hristova
|Decision (unanimous)
|
|align=center|3
|align=center|3:00
|
|-
|Loss
|align=center|4–4
|Joanne Doyle
|Decision (split)
|rowspan=2|2016 IMMAF European Open Championships
|
|align=center|3
|align=center|3:00
|rowspan=2|Prague, Czech Republic
|
|-
|Win
|align=center|4–3
|Iiris Nihti
|Decision (unanimous)
|
|align=center|3
|align=center|3:00
|
|-
|Loss
|align=center|3–3
|Leah McCourt
|TKO (punches)
|rowspan=3|2016 IMMAF World Championships
|
|align=center|1
|align=center|1:54
|rowspan=3|Las Vegas, Nevada, United States
|
|-
|Win
|align=center|3–2
|Fatime Nánási
|Decision (unanimous)
|
|align=center|3
|align=center|3:00
|
|-
|Win
|align=center|2–2
|Chamia Chabbi
|Submission (armbar)
|
|align=center|1
|align=center|0:33
|
|-
|Win
|align=center|1–2
|Malwina Golczak
|Decision (unanimous)
|MMA Meets Wild West
|
|align=center|3
|align=center|3:00
|Templin, Germany
|
|-
|Loss
|align=center|0–2
|Sanna Merta
|Submission (armbar)
|2015 IMMAF European Open Championships
|
|align=center|3
|align=center|1:58
|Wolverhampton, England
|
|-
|Loss
|align=center|0–1
|Jamie Herrington
|Decision (unanimous)
|IMMAF 2015 World Championships
|
|align=center|3
|align=center|3:00
|Las Vegas, Nevada, United States
|
|-

References

External links 

 
 Julia Dorny after winning the world-championship at GNP1
 Julia Dorny at Berliner Morgenpost before the European-championship titel
 Julia Dorny "WOMEN HIT HARDER – The Female Power Podcast by MMA World Champion Julia Dorny" Podcast

1990 births
German female judoka
German female mixed martial artists
Mixed martial artists utilizing kickboxing
Mixed martial artists utilizing judo
Mixed martial artists utilizing Sumo
Mixed martial artists utilizing Brazilian jiu-jitsu
German sportswomen
German women journalists
Sportspeople from Berlin
Humboldt University of Berlin alumni
German sumo wrestlers
Female sumo wrestlers
German practitioners of Brazilian jiu-jitsu
Female Brazilian jiu-jitsu practitioners
Living people